Southern Storm is the seventh studio album by Brazilian death metal band Krisiun. The album was recorded at Stage One Studios in Borgentreich, Germany, with producer Andy Classen. It was released in Europe on 21 July 2008, and in the United States on 5 August 2008, through Century Media Records. The album features a cover of the Sepultura song "Refuse/Resist".

Track listing

Personnel

Krisiun
Alex Camargo – bass, vocals
Moyses Kolesne – guitar
Max Kolesne – drums, percussion

Additional personnel 
Krisiun – arrangement
Andy Classen – rhythm guitar, production, recording, engineering, mixing, mastering
Josh Reuben Galeos – mixing

References 

2008 albums
Krisiun albums
Century Media Records albums
Albums produced by Andy Classen